Edward Clodd (1 July 1840 – 16 March 1930) was an English banker, writer and anthropologist. He had a great variety of literary and scientific friends, who periodically met at Whitsunday (a springtime holiday) gatherings at his home at Aldeburgh in Suffolk.

Biography
Although born in Margate, where his father was captain of a trading brig, the family moved soon afterward to Aldeburgh, his father's ancestors deriving from Parham and Framlingham in Suffolk. Born to a Baptist family, his parents wished him to become a minister, but he instead began a career in accountancy and banking, relocating to London in 1855. He was the only surviving child of seven. Edward first worked unpaid for six months at an accountant's office in Cornhill in London when he was 14 years of age. He worked for the London Joint Stock Bank from 1872 to 1915, and had residences both in London and Suffolk. He married his first wife Eliza Garman, a doctor's daughter in 1862. He had eight children with Eliza, though two died when they were young. In his old age, he married his secretary, Phyllis Maud Rope (born 1887), who survived him by 27 years.

Clodd was an early devotee of the work of Charles Darwin and had personal acquaintance with Thomas Huxley and Herbert Spencer. He wrote biographies of all three men, and worked to popularise evolution with books like The Childhood of the World and The Story of Creation: A Plain Account of Evolution.

Clodd was an agnostic and wrote that the Genesis creation narrative of the Bible is similar to other religious myths and should not be read as a literal account. He wrote many popular books on evolutionary science. He wrote a biography of Thomas Henry Huxley and was a lecturer and populariser of anthropology and evolution.

He was also a keen folklorist, joining the Folklore Society from 1878, and later becoming its president. He was a Suffolk Secretary of the Prehistoric Society of East Anglia from 1914 to 1916. He was a prominent member and officer of the Omar Khayyam Club or 'O.K. Club', and organised the planting of the rose from Omar Khayyam's tomb on to the grave of Edward Fitzgerald at Boulge, Suffolk, at the Centenary gathering.

Clodd had a talent for friendship, and liked to entertain his friends at literary gatherings in Aldeburgh at his seafront home there, Strafford House, during Whitsuntides. Prominent among his literary friends and correspondents were Grant Allen, George Meredith, Thomas Hardy, George Gissing, Edward Fitzgerald, Andrew Lang, Cotter Morison, Samuel Butler, Mary Kingsley and Mrs Lynn Linton; he also knew Sir Henry Thompson, Sir William Huggins, Sir Laurence Gomme, Sir John Rhys, Paul Du Chaillu, Edward Whymper, Alfred Comyn Lyall, York Powell, William Holman Hunt, Sir E. Ray Lankester, H.G. Wells and many others as acquaintances. His hospitality and friendship was an important part of the development of their social relations. George Gissing's close friendship with Clodd began when he accepted an invitation to a Whitsuntide gathering in Aldeburgh in 1895.

Skepticism
Clodd was Chairman of the Rationalist Press Association from 1906 to 1913.

He was skeptical about claims of the paranormal and psychical research, which he wrote were the result of superstition and the outcome of ignorance. He criticised the spiritualist writings of Oliver Lodge as non-scientific. His book Question: A Brief History and Examination of Modern Spiritualism (1917) exposed fraudulent mediumship and the irrational belief in spiritualism and Theosophy.

Works

The following list is incomplete. Biographies of Darwin, Wallace, Bates and Spencer exist.
 1872: The Childhood of the World
 1875: The Birth and Growth of Myth and its Survival in Folk-Lore, Legend, and Dogma. Thomas Scott, London
 1880: Jesus of Nazareth. Kegan Paul, London.
 1882:  Nature Studies. (with Grant Allen, Andrew Wilson, Thomas Foster and Richard Proctor) Wyman, London.
 1888: The Story of Creation: A Plain Account of Evolution
 1891: Myths and Dreams. Chatto & Windus, London.
 1893: The Story of Human Origins (with S. Laing). Chapman & Hall, London.
 1895: A Primer of Evolution Longmans, Green, New York.
 1895: The Story of "Primitive" Man. Newnes, London; Appleton, New York.
 1896: The Childhood of Religions. Kegan Paul, London.
 1897: Pioneers of Evolution from Thales to Huxley. Grant Richards, London.
 1898: Tom Tit Tot: An essay on savage philosophy in folk-tale.
 1900: The story of the Alphabet. Newnes, London.
 1900: Grant Allen: A Memoir.
 1902: Thomas Henry Huxley. Blackwood & Sons, Edinburgh & London.
 1905: Animism: the seed of religion. Constable, London.
 1916: Memories. Chapman & Hall, London.
 1917: The Question: If a Man Die, Shall He Live Again?.  E. J. Clode, New York.
 1920: Magic in Names & Other Things. Chapman & Hall, London.
 1922: Occultism. The Hibbert Journal.
 1922: Occultism: Two Lectures. Watts & Co, London.
 1923: The Ultimate Guide to Brighton, England. McStewart & Earnshaw, London.

Gallery

References

Dictionary of National Biography article by E. S. P. Haynes; revised for the Oxford Dictionary of National Biography by J. F. M. Clark.
Joseph McCabe. (1932). Edward Clodd: A Memoir. John Lane.

External links

 
 
 Archival material at 

1840 births
1930 deaths
Critics of parapsychology
Critics of Spiritualism
Critics of Theosophy
English agnostics
English anthropologists
English male non-fiction writers
English non-fiction writers
English sceptics
People from Margate
Presidents of the Folklore Society
Rationalists